The 1972–73 ABA season was the sixth season of the Denver Rockets. They ended with a 47-37 record, good for third place. They lost in the Division Semifinals to the Indiana Pacers.

Roster

Season standings

Eastern Division

Western Division

Game log
 1972-73 Denver Rockets Schedule and Results | Basketball-Reference.com

Statistics

Playoffs
Western Division Semifinals

Awards and honors
 All-ABA 1st Team: Warren Jabali
 All-ABA 2nd Team: Ralph Simpson
 All-Defensive 1st Team: Julius Keye
 ABA All-Stars: Warren Jabali, Ralph Simpson

Transactions

References

Denver Nuggets seasons
Denver
Denver Nuggets
Denver Nuggets